Jelta Wong is a Papua New Guinean politician. He was first elected to the 10th National Parliament for the Gazelle Open seat in the 2017 General Elections as a United Resource Party candidate. He has been appointed as Minister for Health and HIV/AIDS in two separate terms both under Prime Minister James Marape, after being Minister for Police under Prime Minister Peter O'Neill.

References 

United Resources Party politicians
Living people
Year of birth missing (living people)